John J. Swaim, Jr. (March 19, 1949 – May 4, 2013) was a former Democratic member of the Pennsylvania House of Representatives.
 He was born in Philadelphia. An attorney, he died on May 4, 2013, at the age of 64.

References

Democratic Party members of the Pennsylvania House of Representatives
2013 deaths
1949 births